Lawrenceburg–Lawrence County Airport  is a public use airport located three nautical miles (6 km) northeast of the central business district of Lawrenceburg, a city in Lawrence County, Tennessee, United States. It is owned by the City of Lawrenceburg. This airport is included in the National Plan of Integrated Airport Systems for 2011–2015, which categorized it as a general aviation facility.

Facilities and aircraft 
Lawrenceburg–Lawrence County Airport covers an area of 131 acres (53 ha) at an elevation of 936 feet (285 m) above mean sea level. It has one runway designated 17/35 with an asphalt surface measuring 5,003 by 100 feet (1,525 x 30 m).

For the 12-month period ending April 30, 2011, the airport had 3,638 general aviation aircraft operations, an average of 303 per month. At that time there were 18 aircraft based at this airport: 89% single-engine and 11% multi-engine.

See also 
 List of airports in Tennessee

References

External links 
 Lawrenceburg-Lawrence County Airport (2M2), official site
 Airport page at City of Lawrenceburg website
 Aerial image as of April 1998 from USGS The National Map
 
 

Airports in Tennessee
Transportation in Lawrence County, Tennessee
Buildings and structures in Lawrence County, Tennessee